Rakaposhi also known as Dumani is a mountain of the Karakoram range, located in the Nagar valley of the Gilgit-Baltistan territory of Pakistan. The mountain is extrememly broad measuring almost 20km from East to West. It is the only peak on Earth that drops directly, uninterrupted, for almost 6000m from the summit to the base.

Geography

It is ranked 27th-highest in the world. Rakaposhi rises over the Bagrot, Nagar, and Danyor.
                                
Rakaposhi is the only mountain in the world with more than 5,000 meters height between base camp and the summit; by contrast all of the other tallest mountains in the world have less than 5,000 meters from base camp to top.

The first successful recorded ascent by non-natives was in 1958 by Mike Banks and Tom Patey, members of a British expedition, via the Southwest Spur/Ridge route.

Park
Rakaposhi is also known as Dumani ("Mother of Mist" or "Mother of Clouds").
The people of Nagar and Bagrot Valley have dedicated the Rakaposhi range mountain area as a community park. The Minister for Northern Areas inaugurated the park. The Rakaposhi mountain range is the home of endangered species such as Marco Polo sheep, snow leopard, brown bear, and wolves.

Notable features
Rakaposhi is notable for its exceptional rise over local terrain.  On the north, it rises  in only an 11.2 km (7 mi) horizontal distance from the Hunza River. There are views of Rakaposhi from the Karakoram Highway on the route through Nagar. A tourist spot in the town of Gilgit (located in the  bagrote valley ) called "Zero Point of Rakaposhi" is the closest view point of the mountain.Rakaposhi is the only mountain in the world which rises straight from beautifully cultivated fields to the height of 25,550 feet. From many places this wonderful spectacle can be viewed right from the base to the top.

Time line

 1892 Martin Conway explores the south side of Rakaposhi.
 1938 M. Vyvyan and R. Campbell Secord make the first reconnaissance and climb a north-western forepeak (about ) via the northwest ridge.
 1947 Secord returns with H. W. Tilman and two Swiss climbers, Hans Gyr and Robert Kappeler; they ascend via the Gunti glacier to 5,800 m (19,000 ft) on the south-west spur.
 1954 Cambridge University team, led by Alfred Tissières, attempts the peak via the south-west spur but only reached 6,340 m (20,800 ft). Also, an Austro-German expedition led by Mathias Rebitsch attempted the same route.
 1956 A British-American expedition, led by Mike Banks, reaches 7,163 m (23,500 ft) on the Southwest Ridge, above the Gunti glacier.
 1958 The first successful recorded ascent by non-natives: Mike Banks and Tom Patey, members of a British expedition, via the Southwest Spur/Ridge route. Both of them suffered minor frostbite during the ascent to the summit on June 25. Another climber slipped and fell on the descent and died during the night.
 1964 An Irish expedition attempts the long and difficult Northwest Ridge.
 1971 Karl Herrligkofer leads an attempt on the elegant but difficult North Spur (or North Ridge).
 1973 Herrligkofer returns to the North Spur but is again unsuccessful due to time and weather problems.
 1979 A Polish-Pakistan expedition ascends the Northwest Ridge from the Biro Glacier.
 1979 A Japanese expedition from Waseda University, led by Eiho Ohtani, succeeds in climbing the North Spur. Summit party: Ohtani and Matsushi Yamashita. This ascent was expedition-style, done over a period of six weeks, with 5000 m of fixed rope.
 1984 A Canadian team achieves a semi-alpine-style ascent of the North Spur, using much less fixed rope than the Japanese team had. Summit party: Barry Blanchard, David Cheesmond, Kevin Doyle.
 1985-1987 Various unsuccessful attempts on the long East Ridge.
 1986 A Dutch team climbs a variation of the Northwest Ridge route.
 1995 An ascent via the Northwest Ridge.
 1997 An ascent via the Southwest Spur/Ridge (possibly the original route).
 2000 An attempt from the east side Bagrot Valley Hinercha Glacier.
 2002 A Canadian caliber attempt period of 2 weeks from front side of base camp Hinercha glacier Bagrote valley gilgit east side.
2004 An attempt from the east side Bagrot Valley Hinercha Glacier.
• In 2021, it was successfully climbed by Wajidullah Nagari and two Czech climbers, Jacob Vicek and Peter Macek

Climbing routes

The routes with successful summits so far have been (see the timeline as well):
 Southwest Spur/Ridge (first ascent route). Long, but not exceedingly technical. Some tricky gendarmes (rock pinnacles). Has been repeated.
 From the east side, it is short route to climb  
 Northwest Ridge. Long, and more technically difficult than the Southwest Spur/Ridge. Has been repeated.
 North Spur (a.k.a. North Ridge). Shorter than the above two routes, but much more technically difficult. Has been repeated, including a semi-alpine style (capsule style) ascent.

Attempts have also been made from the east side Bagrot Valley Hinearcha Glacier, the East Ridge, and the North Face.

See also
 Highest mountains of the world
 List of Ultras of the Karakoram and Hindu Kush
 List of mountains in Pakistan

References

Sources
 
 
 Himalayan Index
 DEM files for the Himalaya/Karakoram (Corrected versions of SRTM data)

External links

 Rakaposhi on Summitpost.org
 A list of mountains by local relief and steepness showing Rakaposhi as the world #3.
 Northern Pakistan- highly detailed place marks of towns, villages, peaks, glaciers,   rivers and minor tributaries in Google Earth
A Quick approach through lovely meadows leads to the base camp of RAKAPOSHI

 
Seven-thousanders of the Karakoram
Mountains of Gilgit-Baltistan